Oros is a town and the district headquarters of the Sindhudurg district, Maharashtra. Some call it as "Sindhudurgnagari". Most people of this region speak Malvani, a dialect of Konkani. Sindhudurgnagari is planned town of Oros Budruk. Oros budruk as it is called is connected by road National Highway 66 ( previously known as NH-17) to Mumbai, Thane, Goa, Karwar and Mangaluru. Sindhudurg railway station on Konkan Railway route is the nearest railway station to Oros. Oros houses District collector office, Zilla Parishad office, District court. and District Hospital and other state government offices. The Orus town has few banks, petrol pumps to serve the population of town and visitors.
There is MSRTC bus stand.

References

Cities and towns in Sindhudurg district